This is a list of Ariel Motorcycles.

See also
List of AMC motorcycles
List of BSA motorcycles
List of Douglas motorcycles
List of Triumph motorcycles
List of Royal Enfield motorcycles
List of Velocette motorcycles
List of Vincent motorcycles
Ariel
Ariel